Raymond Nelson (1875–1961) nicknamed "Kell", was a Major League Baseball infielder for the New York Giants in 1901. He went to Amherst College.

External links

1875 births
1961 deaths
New York Giants (NL) players
Major League Baseball second basemen
Baseball players from Massachusetts
Taunton Herrings players
Amherst Mammoths baseball players